is a Japanese singer and actor. He was trainee of Johnny's Jr. and a member of Mr. King, a group formed for a limited time in 2015. He later debuted in the idol group King & Prince in 2018.

Filmography

Stage

TV dramas

Films

Advertisements

Music videos

Awards

References

External links
 – Johnny's Jr. official site by Johnny & Associates 

21st-century Japanese male actors
Japanese male pop singers
People from Nagoya
1997 births
Living people